Barvanan-e Markazi Rural District is in Torkamanchay District of Mianeh County, East Azerbaijan province, Iran. At the National Census of 2006, its population was 2,174 in 490 households. There were 1,606 inhabitants in 447 households at the following census of 2011. At the most recent census of 2016, the population of the rural district was 1,721 in 595 households. The largest of its eight villages was Varzeqan, with 1,015 people.

References 

Meyaneh County

Rural Districts of East Azerbaijan Province

Populated places in East Azerbaijan Province

Populated places in Meyaneh County